Aleksey Igorevich Verbov (born 31 January 1982) is a retired Russian volleyball player, a former member of Russia men's national volleyball team and the Russian club Zenit Kazan. He is currently coaching the men's Zenit Kazan team.

With the Russian men's national team, he won the gold medal at the 2013 Men's European Volleyball Championship played in Denmark and Poland. He won the award as Best Libero in the tournament. He also won the bronze medal in the 2004 Summer Olympics in Athens, Greece.

He played with Lokomotiv Belgorod winning the bronze medal at the 2005–06 CEV Champions League; he won the award "Best Libero" also in this tournament.

Sporting achievements

Clubs

CEV Champions League
  2015/2016 - with Zenit Kazan
  2016/2017 - with Zenit Kazan

FIVB Club World Championship
  Poland 2017 - with Zenit Kazan

National championships
 2015/2016  Russian Championship, with Zenit Kazan

Individually
 2006 CEV Champions League - Best Libero
 2006 FIVB World Championship 2006 - Best Libero
 2007 CEV European Championship - Best Libero
 2008 Olympic Games Beijing - Best Digger
 2009 CEV Champions League - Best Libero
 2009 FIVB World League - Best Libero
 2013 CEV European Championship - Best Libero

References

External links
 Alexey Verbov at FIVB
 Alexey Verbov at Zenit-Kazan
 
 
 
 
 

1982 births
Living people
Russian men's volleyball players
Volleyball players at the 2004 Summer Olympics
Volleyball players at the 2008 Summer Olympics
Olympic volleyball players of Russia
Olympic bronze medalists for Russia
Olympic medalists in volleyball
Medalists at the 2008 Summer Olympics
Medalists at the 2004 Summer Olympics
Sportspeople from Moscow
Volleyball players at the 2016 Summer Olympics
VC Belogorie players
VC Zenit Kazan players
Ural Ufa volleyball players